A total lunar eclipse took place on Tuesday, January 19, 1954.

Visibility

Related lunar eclipses

Lunar year series

Saros series 
It was part of Saros series 133.

Half-Saros cycle
A lunar eclipse will be preceded and followed by solar eclipses by 9 years and 5.5 days (a half saros). This lunar eclipse is related to two annular solar eclipses of Solar Saros 140.

Tritos series 
 Preceded: Lunar eclipse of February 20, 1943
 Followed: Lunar eclipse of December 19, 1964

Tzolkinex 
 Preceded: Lunar eclipse of December 8, 1946
 Followed: Lunar eclipse of March 2, 1961

See also
List of lunar eclipses
List of 20th-century lunar eclipses

Notes

External links

1954-01
1954 in science
January 1954 events